Count Joseph Balthazard Siméon (1781–1846), was a French politician.

He was the son of Joseph Jérôme, Comte Siméon. He entered the diplomatic service under the Empire. At the Restoration he was successively prefect of Var, Doubs and Pas-de-Calais. He was director-general of fine arts in 1828, and had a great reputation as a connoisseur and collector.

1781 births
1846 deaths
Prefects of France
Prefects of Var (department)
Prefects of Doubs
Prefects of Pas-de-Calais